Athletes from the Netherlands competed at the 2002 Winter Olympics in Salt Lake City, United States.

Medalists

Bobsleigh

Men & Women

Short track speed skating

Men

Snowboarding

Women

Speed skating

Men

Women

References
 Winter Olympics 2002, Salt Lake City, full results
 Olympic Winter Games 2002, full results by sports-reference.com

Nations at the 2002 Winter Olympics
2002
Winter Olympics